Tone Poems: The Sounds of the Great Vintage Guitars and Mandolins is an album of duets by mandolinist David Grisman and guitarist Tony Rice using vintage instruments.

Track listing

Personnel
David Grisman – mandolins
Tony Rice – guitars

Some of the songs were performed on instruments made when the songs were written to allow the listener to experience the tonal properties of the original performances.

 Track 1: Martin 1-21 (1891), Gibson A-4 (1905)
 Track 2: Gibson Style "0" (1923), Gibson "3-Point" F-4 (1909)
 Track 3: Maurer Style 953 (c. 1915), Lyon & Healy Style A (1925)
 Track 4: Stahl Style 473 (1931), Vega Style 202 Lute Mandolin (1919)
 Track 5: Martin OM-18 (1931), Gibson A-2Z "Snakehead"(1924)
 Track 6: Martin D-28 (1935), Gibson Lloyd Loar F-5 (1923)
 Track 7: Martin 000-45 (1937), Gibson A-4 "Snakehead" (1924)
 Track 8: Regal "Le Domino" (1930's), S.S. Stewart "Snow Queen" (1930s)
 Track 9: Martin D-45 (1939), Gibson "Loar" A-5 (1923)
 Track 10: Gibson J-100 (1939), Gibson "Fern" F-5 (1925)
 Track 11: Gibson L-Century (1936), Martin Style 2-30 (1936)
 Track 12: Gibson Advanced Jumbo (1937), Gibson F-12 (1934)
 Track 13: Martin 0-18 (1937), Epiphone strand (1937)
 Track 14: Selmer (1950), Gibson F-10 (1934)
 Track 15: Martin D-18 (1943), Gibson F-4 (1942)
 Track 16: Martin D-28 (1952), Gibson Prototype A-5 (1953)
 Track 17: Santa Cruz Tony Rice Model (1993), Gilchrist Model 5 (1993)

References

1994 albums
David Grisman albums
Acoustic Disc albums